The Royal New Zealand Army Logistic Regiment (The Duke of York's Own), is the New Zealand Army's main military Logistics and combat service support (CSS) element. It is the largest regiment in the NZ Army.

History
Prior to 1996, the logistic support to the New Zealand Army was provided by three separate and distinct Corps:
The Royal New Zealand Corps of Transport (RNZCT),
The Royal New Zealand Army Ordnance Corps (RNZAOC)
The Royal New Zealand Electrical and Mechanical Engineers (RNZEME).

On 4 April 1996 the New Zealand Army Chief of the General Staff Major General Piers Reid signed a directive to initiate the establishment of a fully integrated logistic function in the New Zealand Army, with the intention of improving logistic support in both operational and non-operational environments.  The integrated logistic organisation would combine the three separate Corps into a single Regiment. The new regiment, known as the Royal New Zealand Army Logistic Regiment (RNZALR), was formed on 9 December 1996.

On 9 December 1996, members of the RNZCT, RNZAOC and RNZEME marched onto parade grounds on each camp and base, the Flags of the individual Corps were lowered, headdress was replaced with and members of the RNZALR marched off.

Colonel in Chief
Prince Andrew, Duke of York served as the Colonel-in-Chief until January 2022.

Regiment Banner
The Prince Andrew Banner is an outward sign of the Regiment’s heritage, an acknowledgement of the important role it performs today, and the role its predecessors performed with courage and resilience in the past.  The Banner represents the focal point for the traditions, loyalty and spirit of the RNZALR. Presentation of the Prince Andrew Banner by the Colonel in Chief, Royal New Zealand Logistic Regiment, His Royal Highness Prince Andrew on 16 Nov 1998 in Palmerston North.

Following several scandals and allegations against Prince Andrew, his military affiliations were removed by the Queen in January 2022 this included his appointment as Colonel-in-Chief of the Royal New Zealand Army Logistic Regiment (The Duke of York's Own).

A statement on the future of the RNZALR Banner has yet to be released.

The RNZALR Badge 
The RNZALR was to amalgamate not only the RNZCT, RNZAOC and RNZEME Corps but also All Arms Storeman trade personnel from across all Corps and Regiments of the New Zealand Army. To break down the resistance to the new Regiment and extinguish the perceived traits of tribalism that existed among the corps and trades about to be amalgamated, a neutral badge was to be adopted. Following a design competition encompassing 110 designs, a design with no connection to the forming Corps and that was acceptable to the Herald of Arms was selected and approved on 21 October 1996.

The RNZALR badge consists of the following elements;

 A set of green ferns unique to New Zealand providing the main body,
 Crossed Swords representing the Army supporting an oval shield.
 The oval shield has a blue background displaying the stars of the Southern Cross. The Southern Cross is an identifier long associated with New Zealand Army logistics in that it was used as an identifier by;
 2nd New Zealand Expeditionary Force non-divisional vehicles, primary logistics at Maadi in 1942
 The Logistic Support Group from the 1960s
 Headquarters Support Command up to the early 1990s
 A riband embossed with “Royal N.Z Army Logistic Regiment.”
 All surmounted with a St Edwards Crown, which represents the ties to the Monarch.

Structure
Currently the Regiment includes:
2 Combat Service Support Battalion (Linton Military Camp)
10 Transport Company
21 Supply Company
2 Workshop Company
5 Movements Company
38 Combat Service Support Company (NZ Army Reserve)
Combat Service Support Company (North) (Papakura Military Camp)
3 Combat Service Support Battalion (Burnham Military Camp)
3 Transport Company
3 Catering & Supply Company
3 Workshop Company
3 Reserve Company (NZ Army Reserve)

Both battalions are part of the New Zealand 1st Brigade.

Given the nature of NZ Army Units, RNZALR personnel are also embedded in most other units of the NZ Army providing 1st line logistic support to those units.

Trades
The RNZALR includes eleven trades providing various support functions within the NZ Army and across the New Zealand Defence Force (NZDF).

Ammunition Technicians
Ammunition Technicians provide support for the inspection, maintenance and disposal of all ammunition and explosives used by the New Zealand Army. This also includes civil NZ's Explosive Ordnance Disposal (EOD) capability.

Combat Drivers 
Combat Driver operate transport from light to heavy vehicles carrying stores or troops.

Hospitality 
The hospitality trades ensure that the forces are sustained with a balanced diet in garrison and field environments. the Hospitality trade consists of two trades;.

 Chef
 Steward

Maintenance Support Trades
There are five Maintenance support trades;

Armourer
Automotive Technician
Electrical Fitter
Electronics Technician
Maintenance Fitter

These trades  are responsible for the repair and general maintenance of all the Army's equipment. This includes vehicles, radios, night vision devices, general engineering, electrical components and weapons.

Movement Operators
Movement Operators work across all the three services facilitating the movement and support of troops and equipment. The Movement Operator trade consists of three specialties:

 Movement control - the planning and executing of the movement of personnel, vehicles and equipment by road, sea or air.
 Terminal Operations - the management of the loading, unloading and transit of forces by road, sea and air. Terminal Operations include stevedoring and port operations. 
 Aerial Delivery - the Air Dispatch and Movement control of troops and equipment by aircraft including the rigging of stores for delivery by parachute or as under slung loads  underneath helicopters.

Supply Technicians
The senior trade of the RNZALR, Supply Technicians provide Supply & Quartermaster support for the provision, accounting and managing of ammunition, fuel, rations, weapons, general stores, spare parts, vehicles and any other mission critical equipment required by the NZDF within NZ or overseas.

See also
United States Army Logistics Branch
Royal Logistic Corps
Royal Australian Army Ordnance Corps
Royal Canadian Logistics Service
Disbanded Parent Corps
Royal New Zealand Corps of Transport
Royal New Zealand Army Ordnance Corps
Royal New Zealand Electrical and Mechanical Engineers

Order of precedence

References

Sources
Bolton, J. S., A history of The Royal New Zealand Army Ordnance Corps (Trentham: The Corps, 1992) (FR)
Cooke, P. Warrior Craftsmen: Royal New Zealand Electrical & Mechanical Engineers 1942-1996  (Defence of New Zealand Study Group, 2016)
Cape, P., Craftsmen in uniform: the Corps of Royal New Zealand Electrical and Mechanical Engineers: an account (Wellington: Corps of Royal New Zealand Electrical and Mechanical Engineers, c 1976) (FR)
Millen Julia, Salute To Service: A History of the Royal New Zealand Corps of Transport 1860–1996

Regiments of New Zealand
Administrative corps of New Zealand
Military units and formations established in the 1990s
Army logistics units and formations
Organisations based in New Zealand with royal patronage